Dollar Bahu is a Hindi-language television series that aired on Zee TV channel in 2001. The series is based on a novel, Dollar Bahu (Dollar daughter-in-law) by Sudha Murthy. The story portrays the struggle of a middle-class family to graduate into an upper-class one through their son in the USA. Besides, as the title refers, the series was shot in both India as well as in the United States. In addition, when the serial's shooting began in the USA, the 11 September incident occurred.

Overview
The story is about two daughters-in-law of a family, one from America and the other one from India. Now, how their mother-in-law treats them (Rupees and Dollar) is uncovered. The story is more of the mother-in-law who thinks that her American daughter-in-law (dollar bahu) is better than her counterpart in India, since she lives in the land of dreams, USA. Henceforth, she desires to live with her son in America. However, when she lives a year or so in America, she realises that the Indians living there face the same problems and challenges as those of living in India. Now she realise that "grass always looks greener on the other side". And when she comes back to India, she shows immense love to the daughter in law whom she felt to be a trash and her grandson. Finally after getting a slap on feelings by her dollar bahu, Gouramma understands the fact that, may be dollar can remove the poverty from one's life. But family is much more important than that of dollars.

Cast
 Neha Mehta as Vaishali
 Chandni Toor Roy as Charushekar
 Himani Shivpuri as Master Govind's Wife (Mother-In-Law)
 Salman Noor as $lash (Dollar Bae)
 Ismail Bashey as   Shekhar (Eldest Son of Master Govind)
 Rakesh Pandey as Master Govind (Father-In-Law)
 Ranjeet as RK
 Suhasini Mulay as Lakshmi
 Mayuri Kango as Rini (RK & Lakshmi's daughter)
 Deepak Parashar as Javed
 Kunika as Zubeida
 Aashish Kaul as Rahul
 Tina Parekh as Jyoti
 Raj Roy as Joe

References

External links

Dollar Bahu News Article by Tribune India
Dollar Bahu Book by Sudha Murthy

Zee TV original programming
Indian television series
2001 Indian television series debuts
2002 Indian television series endings